Lauren may be a given name or surname. The name's meaning may be "laurel tree", "sweet of honor", or "wisdom". It is derived from the French name Laurence, a feminine version of Laurent, which is in turn derived from the Roman surname Laurentius.

Although originally a male name, the names popularity with females has been widely attributed to actress Lauren Bacall (born Betty Joan Perske). Is a popular name in the UK, the USA, and Australia. In the U.S. the name ranked #170 in 2018 and #148 in 2017. The name was most popular in the U.S. in the 1980s and 1990s.

Given name 
 Laureano Bisan-Etame Mayer (born 1977), commonly known as "Lauren", Cameroonian footballer
 Lauren Ackerman (1905–1993), American physician and pathologist
 Lauren Adams (actress) (born 1982), American actress
 Lauren Adamson (1948–2021), American developmental psychologist
 Lauren Agenbag (born 1996), South African cricket umpire
 Lauren Ahrens (born 1991), Australian rules footballer
 Lauren Alaina (born 1994), American singer and former American Idol 10 contestant
 Lauren Albanese (born 1989), American professional tennis player
 Lauren Alloy, American professor
 Lauren Ambrose (born 1978), American actress and singer
 Lauren Anderson (dancer) (born 1965), American ballet dancer
 Lauren Anderson (model) (born 1980), American model and Playboy Playmate
 Lauren Andino (born 1986), American artist, musician and skateboarder
 Lauren Marie-Elizabeth "Lulu" Antariksa (born 1995), American actress and singer
 Lauren Aquilina (born 1995), British singer
 Lauren Arikan (born 1984, American politician
 Lauren Arnell (born 1987), Australian rules footballer
 Lauren Arnouts (born 1994), Dutch professional racing cyclist
 Lauren Arthur, American politician
 Lauren Ash (born 1983), Canadian actress and comedian
 Lauren Aspinall (born 1998), Australian squash player
Lauren Auder (born 1999), British-French singer and record producer
 Lauren Bacall (1924–2014), American actress born Betty Joan Perske
 Lauren Baillie (born 1982), Scottish lawn bowler
 Lauren Anne Baldwin, British actress
 Lauren Brooke Baldwin (born 1979), American journalist
 Lauren Barlow (born 1985), member of Christian rock band Barlow Girl
 Lauren Barnes (born 1989), American professional soccer defender
 Lauren Barnette (born 1985), Miss Virginia 2007
 Lauren Barnholdt, American author
 Lauren Barwick (born 1977), Canadian equestrian
 Lauren Bay Regula (born 1981), Canadian softball pitcher
 Lauren Beard (born 1984), British children's book illustrator
 Lauren Beers (born 1994), American artistic gymnast
 Lauren Belfer, American writer
 Lauren Bennett (born 1989), British singer, dancer and model
 Lauren Benton (born 1988), British philanthropist
 Lauren Benton (historian) (born 1956), American historian
 Lauren Bercovitch (born 1984), Canadian producer
 Lauren Berlant (1957–2021), American academic
 Lauren Bertolacci (born 1985), Australian volleyball player
 Lauren Beukes (born 1976), South African novelist
 Lauren Billys (born 1988), Puerto Rican Olympic eventing rider
 Lauren Bittner (born 1980), American actress
 Lauren Boebert (born 1986), American politician, businesswoman, congresswoman
 Lauren Bon (born 1962), American artist
 Lauren Book (born 1984), American politician
 Lauren Booth (born 1967), Journalist, activist
 Lauren Ogilvie "Lo" Bosworth (born 1986), American appearing in the reality TV shows Laguna Beach and The Hills
 Lauren Bowles (born 1970), American actress
 Lauren Boyle (born 1987), New Zealand swimmer
 Lauren Brant (born 1989), Australian entertainer
 Lauren Braun Costello (born 1976), American chef
 Lauren Briggs (born 1979), British squash player
 Lauren Brooke, British author
 Lauren Brown (musician), American percussionist
 Lauren Bruton (born 1992), English footballer
 Lauren Burgess (born 1986), New Zealand rugby player
 Lauren Burns (born 1974), Australian martial artist
 Lauren Bush (born 1984), American model
 Lauren Cahoon (born 1985), American taekwondo practitioner
 Lauren Campbell (born 1981), Canadian triathlete
 Lauren Carlini (born 1995), American volleyball player
 Lauren Ashley Carter, American actress and producer
 Lauren Chamberlain (born 1993), American softball player
 Lauren Chapin (born 1945), American actress
 Lauren Cheatle (born 1998), Australian cricket player
 Lauren Chief Elk, Native American feminist educator
 Lauren Child (born 1965), British author and illustrator
 Lauren Cholewinski (born 1988), American speed skater
 Lauren Christy (born 1967), English-born singer and songwriter
 Lauren Cohan (born 1982), American actress best known for her role on The Walking Dead
 Lauren Cohn, newsreader
 Lauren Collins (born 1986), Canadian actress best known for her role on Degrassi: The Next Generation
 Lauren Colthorpe (born 1985), Australian association football player
 Lauren Conrad (born 1986), American reality television star known for her role on The Hills
 Lauren Cornell, American curator
 Lauren Corrao, American television executive
 Lauren Cox (born 1998), American professional basketball player
 Lauren Crace (born 1986), British actress
 Lauren Crandall (born 1985), American field hockey player
 Lauren Creamer (born 1992), Irish cyclist
 Lauren Cuthbertson (born 1984), British ballerina
 Lauren Daigle (born 1991), American singer
 Lauren Davies, British novelist
 Lauren Davis (born 1993), American professional tennis player
 Lauren B. Davis (born 1955), Canadian writer
 Lauren De Crescenzo (born 1990), American cyclist
 Lauren DeStefano (born 1984), American author
 Lauren Diewold (born 1990), Canadian actress
 Lauren Donner (born 1949), American producer
 Lauren Doyle (born 1991), American rugby sevens player
 Lauren Drain (born 1985), American nurse
 Lauren Drummond (born 1987), British actress
 Lauren Duca (born 1991), American freelance writer and reporter
 Lauren Dukoff (born 1984), American photographer
 Lauren Ebsary (born 1983), Australian women's cricketer
 Lauren Egea (born 1996), Spanish professional footballer
 Lauren Elaine (born 1983), American fashion designer, actress and model
 Lauren Elder, American artist and designer
 Lauren Elder (born 1990) (born 1990), American artist
 Lauren Elliott (born 1946), American video game designer
 Lauren Ellis (born 1989), New Zealand track cyclist
 Lauren Embree (born 1991), American tennis player
 Lauren English (born 1989), American swimmer
 Lauren Ervin (born 1985), American women's basketball player
 Lauren Evans (born 1983), American singer and songwriter
 Lauren Ezersky, American television presenter
 Lauren Fagan, Australian operatic soprano
 Lauren Faust (born 1974), Emmy-nominated American animator and creator of My Little Pony: Friendship Is Magic
 Lauren Fendrick (born 1982), American professional beach volleyball player
 Lauren Fensterstock (born 1975), American artist, writer, curator, critic
 Lauren Filer (born 2000), English cricketer
 Lauren Fisher (born 1982), American former tennis player
 Lauren Fix, American journalist
 Lauren Flaherty, American business woman and chief marketing officer
 Lauren Flanigan (born 1959), American singer
 Lauren Flax, DJ, songwriter and producer
 Lauren Fleshman (born 1981), American track and field athlete
 Lauren Fowlkes (born 1988), Association footballer
 Lauren Froderman (born 1991), American dancer
 Lauren Frost (born 1985), heroine in the series "Bloom"
 Lauren Gale (1917–1996), American basketball player
 Lauren Gale (sprinter) (born 2000), Canadian athlete
 Lauren Galley (born 1995), American author
 Lauren Gardner (born 1985), American sportscaster
 Lauren Geremia (born 1982), American interior designer
 Lauren German (born 1978), American actress
 Lauren Gibbemeyer (born 1988), American indoor volleyball player
 Lauren Gibbs (born 1984), American bobsledder
 Lauren Gibson (born 1991), American softball player
 Lauren Giraldo (born 1998), American singer, actress, producer and advocate
 Lauren Glassberg (born 1971), American journalist
 Lauren Glazier (born 1985), Canadian actress
 Lauren Gold (born 1981), English fashion model and actress
 Lauren Goodger (born 1986), English TV personality and model
 Lauren Goodnight (born 1980), American voice actor
 Lauren Gottlieb, Indian actor and dancer
 Lauren Graham (born 1967), American actress
 Lauren Grandcolas (1963–2001), American terrorism victim
 Lauren Gray (born 1991), Scottish curler
 Lauren Green (born 1958), American musician
 Lauren Greenfield (born 1966), American artist and documentary photographer
 Lauren Gregg (born 1960), American soccer coach
 Lauren Greutman (born 1981), American author
 Lauren Griffiths (born 1987), English cricketer
 Lauren Grodstein (born 1975), American novelist
 Lauren Groff (born 1978), American novelist
 Lauren Gunderson (born 1982), American playwright
 Lauren Gussis, American television writer
 Lauren Haeger (born 1992), American professional softball pitcher
 Lauren Hall (born 1979), American cyclist
 Lauren Hogg (born 2003), American gun control advocate
 Lauren Kelsey Hall (born 1984), beauty queen
 Lauren Hallowell (born 1989), British ice hockey player
 Lauren Hammersley, Canadian actress
 Lauren Haney (born 1936), American novelist
 Lauren Harries (born 1978), child actor
 Lauren Harris (born 1984), British singer
 Lauren Hart (born 1967), American musician
 Lauren Henderson (born 1966), English novelist
 Lauren Henry (born 1988), former South African figure skater
 Lauren Zoe "Laurie" Hernandez (born 2000), American artistic gymnast
 Lauren Herring (born 1993), US tennis player
 Lauren Hewett (born 1981), Australian actress
 Lauren Hewitt (born 1978), Australian track and field
 Lauren Hildebrandt (born 1982), American musician
 Lauren Hill (basketball) (born 1995), American basketball player
 Lauren Michelle Hill (born 1979), Playboy playmate
 Lauren Hobart (born 1969/1970), American businesswoman
 Lauren Hoffman (born 1977), American singer
 Lauren Holiday (born 1987), American soccer player
 Lauren Holly (born 1963), American actress
 Lauren Holmes, American author
 Lauren Holt (born 1991), American actress
 Lauren Holtkamp (born 1980), American professional referee
 Lauren Howe (golfer) (born 1959), American professional golfer
 Lauren Howe (model) (born 1993), Canadian actress and model / Miss Universe 2017
 Lauren Hunkin (born 1979), Canadian show jumper
 Lauren Hutton (born 1943), former model
 Lauren Iungerich (born 1974), American writer
 Lauren J. Fuchs, American field hockey player
 Lauren Jackson (born 1981), Australian basketball player
 Lauren Jansen (born 1992), Australian basketball player
 Lauren Jauregui (born 1996), American singer
 Lauren Jelencovich (born 1980s), American soprano singer, Yanni vocalist
 Lauren Jenkins (born 1991), American singer-songwriter, actress and director
 Lauren Jeska (born 1974), British transgender athlete convicted of attempted murder
 Lauren Johnson (born 1987), American middle-distance runner
 Lauren Jones (born 1982), American actress
 Lauren K. Alleyne, Trinidadian-American immigrant poet and author
 Lauren Kalman (born 1980), American visual artist
 Lauren Kate (born 1981), American writer
 Lauren Kennedy (born 1973), American actress
 Lauren Kern, American magazine editor
 Lauren Kessler, American writer
 Lauren Kieffer (born 1987), American equestrian
 Lauren Kim Roche (born 1961), New Zealand writer
 Lauren Kitchen (born 1990), Australian cyclist
 Lauren Kleppin (born 1988), American long-distance runner
 Lauren Komanski (born 1985), American bicycle racer
 Lauren Koslow (born 1953), American actress
 Lauren Lake (born 1969), American lawyer and broadcaster
 Lauren Landa, American voice actor
 Lauren Lane (born 1961), American actress
 Lauren Lanning (born 1983), Miss Texas 2006
 Lauren Lapkus (born 1985), American actress
 Lauren Lappin (born 1984), American softball player
 Lauren Laverne (born 1978), British disc jockey
 Lauren Lazin, film and television director
 Lauren Lazo (born 1993), American association football player
 Lauren Lenentine (born 2000), Canadian curler
 Lauren Liebenberg (born 1972), South African writer
 Lauren Lillo (born 1984), American bodybuilder
 Lauren Lindsey Donzis (born 2004), American actress
 Lauren LoGiudice, American actress
 Lauren London (born 1984), American actress known for her role in ATL
 Lauren Lucas, American musician
 Lauren Lueders (born 1987), American basketball player
 Lauren Luke (born 1981), English makeup artist and Internet Mogul
 Lauren Lyle (born 1993), Scottish actress
 Lauren D. Lyman (1891–1972), American journalist
 Lauren Lyster (born 1981), American finance journalist
 Lauren MacColl, fiddle player
 Lauren McCrostie (born 1996), British actress
 Lauren McFall (born 1980), American swimmer
 Lauren McKnight (born 1988), American actress
 Lauren McQueen (born 1996), English actress
 Lauren MacMullan (born 1971), animation director best known for her work on King of the Hill
 Lauren Maltby (born 1984), American actress
 Lauren Mann (born 1984), Canadian curler
 Lauren Manning (born 1961), American author
 Lauren Mansfield (born 1989), Australian basketball player
 Lauren Marcus, American actress
 Lauren Matsumoto (born 1987), American politician
 Lauren Mayberry (born 1987), British singer
 Lauren Mayhew (born 1985), American singer and actress
 Lauren Meece (born 1983), American judoka
 Lauren Mellor (born 1985), South African fashion model
 Lauren Elizabeth "Laurie" Metcalf (born 1955), American actress
 Lauren Miller (born 1982), American actress
 Lauren Milliet (born 1996), American soccer midfielder
 Lauren Mitchell (born 1991), gymnast
 Lauren Molina (born 1981), American actress
 Lauren Mollica (born 1980), American skateboarder
 Lauren Montgomery (born 1980), American artist
 Lauren Morelli (born 1982), American writer
 Lauren Moss (born 1987), Australian politician
 Lauren Mote (born 1997), English actress
 Lauren Murdoch, Australian head chef
 Lauren Murphy (born 1983), American mixed martial artist
Lauren "Mykie" Mychal (born 1989), American YouTuber and make-up artist
 Lauren Myracle (born 1969), author
 Lauren Nelson (born 1986), Miss American 2007
 Lauren Newton (born 1952), American singer
 Lauren Nicholson (born 1993), Australian professional basketball player
 Lauren Nourse (born 1982), Australian netball player
 Lauren O'Connell (born 1988), singer/songwriter
 Lauren O'Farrell, British writer and artist
 Lauren O'Neil, British actress
 Lauren O'Reilly (born 1989), Canadian volleyball player
 Lauren O'Rourke, English actress
 Lauren Oliver (born 1982), American author
 Lauren Ornelas, American activist
 Lauren Keyana Keke Palmer (born 1993), American actress
 Lauren Paolini (born 1987), American volleyball player
 Lauren Parkes (born 1987), Miss Black Delaware USA 2007
 Lauren Patten (born 1992), American actress
 Lauren Perdue (born 1991), American swimmer, Olympic gold medalist
 Lauren Perkins (born 1988), American skateboarder
 Lauren Phillips, British actress, television presenter
 Lauren Platt (born 1997), British singer
 Lauren Plawecki (born 1994), American politician
 Lauren Poe, mayor of Gainesville
 Lauren Poetschka (born 1974), Australian hurdler
 Lauren Pope (born 1982), English actress
 Lauren Potter (born 1990), American actress
 Lauren Powers (born 1961), American actress and bodybuilder
 Lauren Powley (born 1984), American field hockey player
 Lauren Price (born 1994), British boxing
 Lauren Pritchard (actress) (born 1977), American actress
 Lauren "Lolo" Pritchard (born 1987), American actress and singer
 Lauren Quigley (born 1995), British swimmer
 Lauren Raine, American artist
 Lauren Redniss, American artist and writer
 Lauren Rembi (born 1992), French fencer
 Lauren Resnick, American psychologist
 Lauren Reynolds (born 1991), Australian cyclist
 Lauren Ridloff (born 1978), American actress
 Lauren Rikleen, American attorney, author and expert speaker
 Lauren Rowles (born 1998), British parasport rower
 Lauren Royal, American author
 Lauren S. McCready (1915–2007), founder of the US Merchant Marine Academy
 Lauren Samuels (born 1988), British actress and singer
 Lauren Sánchez (born 1969), American news anchor
 Lauren Sanderson (born 1996), American singer and songwriter
 Lauren Santo Domingo (born 1976), American magazine editor
 Lauren Savoy (born 1963), American musician
 Lauren Scala (born 1982), American television reporter
 Lauren Schacher (born 1985), American screenwriter
 Lauren Scherf (born 1988), Australian basketball player
 Lauren Schmetterling (born 1988), American rower
 Lauren Schmidt Hissrich (born 1978), American television producer
 Lauren Scott, American LGBT activist
 Lauren Scruggs (born 1988), American fashion journalist, blogger and model
 Lauren Selby (born 1984), British squash player
 Lauren Selig, American film producer
 Lauren Senft (born 1987), figure skater
 Lauren Sesselmann (born 1983), American-born Canadian defender, former forward
 Lauren Shakely (born 1948), American poet
 Julia Lauren Shehadi (born 1983), American sportscaster
 Lauren Shera (born 1988), American musician
 Lauren Sherman, American journalist
 Lauren Siddall (born 1984), British squash player
 Lauren Silva (born 1987), American painter
 Lauren Silver (born 1993), American footballer
 Lauren Silver (water polo) (born 1987), American water polo player
 Lauren Sisler (born 1984), American sports journalist
 Lauren Simmons (born 1994), African American stock trader
 Lauren Slater (born 1963), writer and psychologist
 Lauren Smith (badminton) (born 1991), British badminton player
 Lauren Lee Smith (born 1980), Canadian actress
 Lauren Socha (born 1990), British actress
 Lauren Southern (born 1995), Canadian political activist
 Lauren Spalding (born 1980), American sprint canoer
 Lauren Spierer (born 1991), American college student
 Lauren Stamile (born 1976), American actress
 Lauren States (born 1956), former Chief of Technology
 Lauren Steadman (born 1992), British Paralympian
 Lauren Stephens (born 1986), American racing cyclist
 Lauren Storm (born 1987), American actress and model
 Lauren Strawn (born 1992), American singer-songwriter
 Lauren Tamayo (born 1983), American professional racing cyclist
 Lauren Tarshis (born 1963), author of the I Survived series and Emma-Jean Lazarus
 Lauren Taylor (actress) (born 1998), American actress
 Lauren Taylor (golfer) (born 1994), English professional golfer
 Lauren Taylor (journalist), British journalist
 Lauren-Marie Taylor (born 1961), American actress
 Lauren Terrazzano (1968-2007), American journalist
 Cynthia Lauren Tewes (born 1954), American actress best known for her role in TV's The Love Boat
 Lauren Thomas-Johnson (born 1988), British professional basketball player
 Lauren Thompson (born 1982), American television journalist
 Lauren Tom (born 1961), American actress best known for her role in The Joy Luck Club
 Lauren Townsend (footballer) (born 1990), Welsh football defender
 Lauren Toyota, Canadian actress
 Lauren Turner (born 1986), American singer
Lauren Underwood (born 1986), American politician
 Lauren Caitlin Upton (born 1989), Miss Teen USA 2007
 Lauren V. Wood, American allergist
 Lauren van Oosten (born 1978), Canadian competitive swimmer, Olympic athlete, Pan American Games gold medallist
 Lauren Vaughan, American politician from Washington, D.C.
 Lauren Vélez (born 1964), Puerto Rican actress
 Lauren Verster (born 1980), Dutch programme maker and television presenter
 Lauren Von Der Pool, American celebrity chef, cookbook author and caterer
 Lauren Walker (born 1989), British football player
 Lauren Walsh, American actress
 Lauren Ward (born 1970), American actress
 Lauren Weedman (born 1969), American actress
 Lauren Weinstein (comics) (born 1975), American comic book artist
 Lauren Weinstein (technologist), activist concerned with matters involving technology
 Lauren Weisberger (born 1977), American novelist
 Lauren Wells (athlete) (born 1988), Australian athletics competitor
 Lauren Wells (footballer) (born 1988), Welsh football goalkeeper
 Lauren Wenger (born 1984), water polo player
 Lauren Whittington, American journalist
 Lauren Wildbolz (born 1981), Swiss cook, cooking expert and writer
 Lauren Wilkinson (ice hockey) (born 1989), British ice hockey player
 Lauren Wilkinson (rower) (born 1989), Canadian rower
 Lauren Willig (born 1977), American author
 Lauren Williams (footballer) (born 1994), American-Saint Kitts and Nevis footballer
 Lauren Williams (ice hockey) (born 1996), Canadian ice hockey player
 Lauren Williams (journalist), American journalist and former editor-in-chief of Vox
 Lauren Williams (mathematician), American mathematician
 Lauren Williams (professional wrestling) (born 1981), Canadian professional wrestler
 Lauren Williams (taekwondo) (born 1999), Welsh taekwondo athlete
 Lauren Wilson (born 1987), Canadian figure skater
 Lauren Winfield (born 1990), English cricket player
 Lauren Winner (born 1976), American writer
 Lauren Wise, Canadian-American epidemiologist
 Lauren Wolkstein (born 1982), American film director
 Lauren Wood, American singer
 Lauren Woodland (born 1977), American actress
 Lauren Woods, American artist
 Lauren Woolstencroft (born 1981), Paralympic skier
 Lauren Worsham (born 1982), American singer actress
 Lauren Yee (playwright), American playwright
 Lauren Young (born 1993), actress
 Lauren Zakrin, American actress
 Lauren Zander (born 1970), American author

Fictional characters 
 Lauren Ackerman in iCarly
 Lauren Adams (character) in CHERUB
 Lauren Andrews in Waterloo Road
 Lauren Fenmore Baldwin in The Young and the Restless
 Lauren Branning in EastEnders
 Lauren Cooper in The Catherine Tate Show
 Lauren Hutchinson in Square Pegs
 Lauren Lewis in the Canadian television series Lost Girl
 Lauren Mallory in Twilight
 Lauren Miller, a character played by Courteney Cox in the American sitcom television series Family Ties
 Lauren Oya Olamina in Parable of the Sower
Lauren Reed in the television show Alias
 Lauren "Lo" Ridgemount in the Canadian animated series Stoked
 Lauren Shiba in the Nickelodeon TV Series Power Rangers Samurai
 Lauren Strucker in the television show The Gifted
 Lauren Valentine in Hollyoaks
 Lauren Zizes in Glee
 Lauren, protagonist of Slender: The Arrival

See also
 Lauren-Ashley Redmond (born 1991), American country singer
 Laura (given name)
 Lauran, a given name
 Laure (disambiguation)
 Laureen
 Laurene
 Laurens (given name)
 Laurent (name), a given name
 Laurin, a surname and given name
 Lauron (disambiguation)
 Lauryn, a given name
 Loren, a given name

References

Feminine given names
French masculine given names

English feminine given names
Given names derived from plants or flowers
Unisex given names